Frohnsdorf is a village and a former municipality in the district Altenburger Land, in Thuringia, Germany. Since July 2018, it is part of the municipality Nobitz.

References

Altenburger Land
Duchy of Saxe-Altenburg
Former municipalities in Thuringia